Krishna Godavari Basin is a peri-cratonic passive margin basin in India. It is spread across more than 50,000 square kilometres in the Krishna River and Godavari River basins in Andhra Pradesh. The site is known for the D-6 block where Reliance Industries discovered the biggest natural gas reserves in India in 2003.

Discoveries
The first gas discovery in the basin was in 1983, in Razole Well No 1, when ONGC had a small office in Rajahmundry and Narsapur. Since that discovery Reliance and others have joined the exploration effort.

 14 trillion cubic feet (0.4 trillion cubic metre) of gas by Reliance Industries in KG-DWN-98/l (KG-D6) in 2006. 1,800 metre (6,000 feet) below the sea floor.
  of gas by Gujarat State Petroleum Corporation in June 2005. The initial reseverves estimate was reduced by 90% in a field development plan commissioned by GSPC in 2009.  
 Potentially  of gas in place at D-3 and D-9 blocks, as estimated in May 2011. According to Reliance Industries: "This includes identified prospects and leads and a number of postulated prospects based on the play area and field size distribution."
 A gas discovery by ONGC in June 2009, which an anonymous company official said could have an estimated .

Tight oil and gas reserves
KG inland and offshore basins have good prospects of unconventional tight oil and tight gas reserves from the conducted  field studies. Most of the conventional wells drilled and operated have a shorter lifespan than envisaged life and with erratic production. This may be due to drilling of conventional wells in tight oil and gas fields without horizontal drilling in the shale rock formations and hydraulic fracturing.

Ecology

The basin is home to olive ridley sea turtle, a vulnerable species.

Projects 

KG-DWN-98/1 (KG-D6) - 8100 km2. The total project is expected to cost $100 billion. 50 km off the coast of Kakinada.

CAG audit 
The Reliance Industries Limited (RIL) was supposed to relinquish 25% of the total area outside the discoveries in 2004 and 2005, as per the Production Sharing Contract (PSC). However, the entire block was declared as a discovery area and RIL was allowed to retain it. In 2011, the Comptroller and Auditor General of India (CAG) criticised the Oil Ministry for this decision. The CAG also faulted RIL for limiting the competition in contracts, stating that RIL awarded a $1.1 billion contract to Aker on a single-bid basis.

In May 2014, ONGC alleged that Reliance was illegally extracting gas from blocks owned by ONGC in Krishna Godavari Basin.

Gas pricing

GP = 2.5 + (OP – 25) ^0.15

As the annual Brent price has always been above the cap price since 2007, the revised gas price at  during the year 2014 is in excess of the applicable price by nearly 20%.

See also

 East West Gas Pipeline (India)
 Deccan Traps

References 

Geography of Andhra Pradesh
Natural gas in India
Natural gas fields in India
Energy in Andhra Pradesh
Oil fields in India
Geology of Andhra Pradesh
Reliance Industries
ONGC oil and gas fields
BP oil and gas fields
Reliance oil and gas fields